"Taste It" is a song by Australian rock band INXS, released as the fourth single from their eighth album, Welcome to Wherever You Are (1992), in November 1992. The song was written by Andrew Farriss and Michael Hutchence. It peaked at  36 on the ARIA Singles Chart and also charted in New Zealand, Switzerland, the United Kingdom, and the United States.

B-sides
The B-sides include a solo compositions from guitarist Kirk Pengilly entitled "Light the Planet" as well as Youth remixes of "Taste It" and a Ralphi Rosario club mix of future single "Not Enough Time". In the UK, a second CD was available with further club mixes of three singles from the X album.

Reception
Q said, "The simple fact is that after a sustained period of rock in excess, INXS have found soul. "Taste It" grooves on a marvellously ambient and woolly drum sound."

Track listings
7-inch and cassette single INXS23; INXMC23 Mercury/UK
 "Taste It" (LP version)
 "Light the Planet"

CD5 maxi single INXCD23 Mercury/UK
 "Taste It" (LP version)
 "Taste It" (Youth 12" Mix)
 "Not Enough Time" (Ralphi Rosario Mix)
 "Light the Planet"

CD5 maxi single INXCB23 Mercury/UK
 "Taste It" (Youth Acapella Mix)
 "Suicide Blonde" (Oakenfold Milk Mix)
 "Disappear" (Morales Mix)
 "Bitter Tears" (Lorimer 12" Mix)

CD5 864 685-2 Mercury/Germany
 "Taste It" (LP version)
 "Taste It" (Youth 12" Mix)
 "Light the Planet"
 "Suicide Blonde" (Oakenfold Milk Mix)

CD5 45099-1293-2 EastWest/Australia
 "Taste It" (LP version)
 "Taste It" (Youth 12" Mix)
 "Not Enough Time"

CD single 7-87409-2 Atlantic/US
 "Taste It" (LP version)
 "Questions" (No Vocals)

CD3 WMD5-4123 WEA/Japan
 "Taste It" (LP version)
 "Taste It" (Youth 12" Mix)

Cassette single 7-87409-4 Atlantic/US
 "Taste It" (LP version)
 "11th Revolution"

Chart performance
The song reached No. 21 in the United Kingdom and No. 36 in Australia. In the United States, it reached No. 5 on the Billboard Modern Rock Tracks chart.

Weekly charts

References

INXS songs
1992 singles
1992 songs
Atlantic Records singles
East West Records singles
Mercury Records singles
Song recordings produced by Mark Opitz
Songs written by Andrew Farriss
Songs written by Michael Hutchence